Badasahi is a Vidhan Sabha constituency of Mayurbhanj district, Odisha.

Area of this constituency includes Betnoti block and  21 GPs (Badasahi, Balabhadrapur, Bhimda, Bireswarpur, Chandanpur, Chhelia (A), Deulia, Durgapur, Jogniugaon, Kendudiha, Kochilakhuntha, Madhapur, Mangovindpur, Manitri, Patisari, Paunsia, Salgaon, Sialighaty, Suhagpur, Talapada and Pratappur) of Badasahi block.

In 2009 election Biju Janata Dal candidate Manoranjan Sethi, defeated Indian National Congress candidate Ganeswar Patra by a margin of 15,499 votes.

Elected Members
Only one election held during 2009. List of members elected from Badasahi Vidhan Sabha constituency is:

2009: (20): Manoranjan Sethi (BJD)
2014: Ganeswar Patra (BJD)

2019 Election

Election results

2014 Election

2009 Election

Notes

References

Politics of Mayurbhanj district
Assembly constituencies of Odisha